The 1991 Belmont Stakes was the 123rd running of the Belmont Stakes at Belmont Park in Elmont, New York held on June 8, 1991. With a field of eleven horses,  Hansel won by a head over 1991 Kentucky Derby winner Strike the Gold in front of a crowd of over 51,000 spectators. While the  Triple Crown was not up for grabs due to  Strike the Gold's loss at the 1991 Preakness Stakes, four horses were eligible for the $1,000,000  Triple Crown Challenge

The Road to the 1991 Belmont Stakes 

 Hansel had won the March 1991 Grade-2  Jim Beam Stakes and the April 1991 Grade-2 Lexington Stakes. In the 1991 Kentucky Derby, he placed a disappointing 10th place, finishing 10 lengths behind winner, Strike the Gold. Due to his poor showing, his owners considered not even running him in the 1991 Preakness Stakes. His owners gamble worked out as on May 18th, 1991, when he captured the 1991 Preakness Stakes by 7 lengths over Corporate Report. 

Strike the Gold had won the April 1991 Blue Grass Stakes defeating favorite Fly So Free by a half-length after finishing 2nd to Fly So Free at the 1991 Florida Derby. He captured the 1991 Kentucky Derby, but finished a disappointing 6th place at the 1991 Preakness Stakes.

Mane Minister had only won smaller listed stakes races, but was able to place on the podium at the 1991 Kentucky Derby and the 1991 Preakness Stakes.

Corporate Report had only won an allowance race but had a surprise second place finish at the 1991 Preakness Stakes.

Scan had multiple podium finishes in Grade-2 and Grade-3 races, but hadn't won a race otherwise since the November 1990 Remsen Stakes.

Quintana came in 6th at the 1991 Kentucky Derby, but opted for the May 1991 Grade-3 Peter Pan Stakes over the Preakness and finished in 4th.

Lost Mountain, after have not won any stakes races, got the upset win at the 1991 Peter Pan Stakes over Quintana and decided to compete.

Subordinated Debt had finished on the podium multiple times in graded races and won the May 8th, 1991 Withers Stakes.

Green Alligator won the Grade-3 April 1991 California Derby and finished 4th at the 1991 Kentucky Derby

Smooth Performance and Another Review had not won any graded races.

Best Pal was speculated to run but was pulled due to exhaustion.

Results

Times:  mile: :23.04,  mile: :46.79, mile: 1:11.75, 1 mile:  1:36.69, Final: 2:28.10

Payout schedule

See also
1991 Kentucky Derby
1991 Preakness Stakes

References

Belmont Stakes races
Belmont Stakes
Belmont Stakes
Belmont Stakes